Herbert Schulze may refer to:
 Herbert Schulze (musicologist) (1923-1975), German expert on Schumann
 Herbert Schulze (soldier), German Waffen-SS officer, recipient of the  Knight's Cross of the Iron Cross in 1943
 Herbert Schultze, German U-boat commander of the Kriegsmarine